Kasso Chahal  is a village in Kapurthala district of Punjab State, India. The village is administrated by a Sarpanch, who is an elected representative.

Demography 
According to the report published by Census India in 2011, Kasso Chahal has total number of 61 houses and population of 305 of which include 167 males and 138 females. Literacy rate of Kasso Chahal is 79.79%, higher than state average of 75.84%.  The population of children under the age of 6 years is 23 which is 7.54% of total population of Kasso Chahal, and child sex ratio is approximately 643, lower than state average of 846.

Population data

Air travel connectivity 
The closest airport to the village is Sri Guru Ram Dass Jee International Airport.

Villages in Kapurthala

References

External links
  Villages in Kapurthala
 Kapurthala Villages List

Villages in Kapurthala district